Scotty Joe Weaver (March 26, 1986 – July 22, 2004) was an 18-year-old murder victim from Bay Minette, Alabama, whose burned and partially decomposed body was discovered on July 22, 2004, a few miles from the mobile home in which he lived.  He had been beaten, strangled and stabbed numerous times, partially decapitated, and his body doused in gasoline and set on fire.

The Baldwin County District Attorney, David Whetstone, stated that Weaver's sexual orientation was a factor in the crime. He remarked that the brutality involved "is suggestive of overkill, which is not something you see in a regular robbery and murder." Alabama's hate crimes statute does not apply to people targeted because of their sexual orientation.

Three people were charged with capital murder and robbery in connection with the crime, two of whom were Weaver's roommates: Christopher Gaines, aged 20, Nichole Kelsay, aged 18, and Robert Porter, aged 18. Nichole Kelsay had been Weaver's friend throughout most of his life.

In May 2007, with Judge Langford Floyd presiding, Christopher Gaines pleaded guilty and was sentenced to life in prison without parole; he is serving his sentence at Holman Correctional Facility in Atmore. Porter pleaded guilty to murder and first degree robbery in September 2007, and received two consecutive life sentences; he is serving his sentence at William E. Donaldson Correctional Facility in Bessemer. Kelsay pleaded guilty and was sentenced to 20 years imprisonment for conspiracy to commit murder.

This crime was featured in Small Town Gay Bar, a 2006 documentary film depicting the difficulties of being gay in the rural South.

References

External links
 Memorial to Scott Weaver at stophate.us
 Grave of Scotty Joe Weaver (1986–2004) on www.findagrave.com  https://www.findagrave.com/memorial/9272618

1986 births
2004 deaths
2004 murders in the United States
American murder victims
People murdered in Alabama
Deaths by beating in the United States
Deaths by stabbing in the United States
Deaths by strangulation in the United States
People from Bay Minette, Alabama
Violence against gay men in the United States
Violence against men in North America
 gay men